is a private women's college in Ibaraki, Osaka, Japan. The predecessor of the school was founded in 1878 by educator Poro Sawayama. It was chartered as a junior women's college in 1950 and became a four-year college in 1964.

References

External links
 Official website (Japanese)
 Official website (English)

Educational institutions established in 1878
Christian universities and colleges in Japan
Private universities and colleges in Japan
Universities and colleges in Osaka Prefecture
1878 establishments in Japan
Women's universities and colleges in Japan